Rongo is an electoral constituency in Kenya. It is one of eight constituencies of Migori County. The constituency was established for the 1988 elections.

Members of Parliament

Wards

References 

Constituencies in Migori County
Constituencies in Nyanza Province
1988 establishments in Kenya
Constituencies established in 1988